Hendrik-Ido-Ambacht is a town and municipality in the western Netherlands. It is located on the island of IJsselmonde, and borders with Zwijndrecht, Ridderkerk, and the Noord River (with Alblasserdam and Papendrecht on the other side).

The municipality comprises no other population centres.

Name 
Until 1855, the town was known as Hendrik-Ido-Schildmanskinderen-Ambacht en de Oostendam. Then it merged with Sandelingen-Ambacht and its full name for a period of time was said to be Hendrik-Ido-Oostendam-Schildmanskinderen-Groot-en-Klein-Sandelingen-Ambacht. This used to be the longest name of any town on the mainland of Europe.

Topography 

Dutch topographic map of the municipality of Hendrik-Ido-Ambacht, June 2015

History 

The area has been populated from circa the year 1000 CE. Agriculture and animal husbandry were the only means of existence for many centuries. During these days, the land would often get flooded.
Most of the land belonged to the Bishop of Utrecht during this period, except Heyenland (later known as Heerjansdam), which belong to Lord  Hendrick I van Brederode (1305-1345). In 1323 the abbey sold its land permanently to William III of Holland.

To combat the floods and utilize the lands more productively, William III  and Hendrick van Brederode put up a ringdyke around the land and had it dregded in 1332. To fund this endeavor, they sold parts of the lands to wealthy families (who held high public ranks within other cities) offering lordshiptitles and land ownership in return (as dictated by Zeelandic Laws concerning land ownership). 
Among these men were Hendrik Ido Wittens and his brother Schiltman Wittens, sons of the municipal executive of Gorinchem Hendrik Yens Wittens. They received lordship of small pieces of land around the dead arm of the river Wale. The town Hendrik-Ido-Ambacht was made of an fusion of these two lordships. Over the years it expended by annexation and fusion with other lands of differents lords.      

Not until the Eighty Years' War some industrial activities began to appear along the river dikes, like stonebakery and shipbuilding. Furthermore, horticulture and flax growing also developed within the polders.

Because of the rapid industrial growth in ironfoundries and shipyards in nearby villages (which produced lots of scrapwaste), several families opened up ship breaking yards which grew into an industry resulting in the town becoming worldwide known as the "ship breaking village".

The establishment of industries in the region changed the centuries-old seasonal labour to permanent work opportunities with higher wages.
These industries were lost in later times when they moved upbroad to lower wage countries. Nowadays the village functions as a commuter town, since its citizens mainly work elsewere. 

Several monumental farms and buildings, including the 14th century Reformed Church, remain as a reminder of its historic past.

Notable people 
 Cornelis Ekkart (1892–1975 in H.I. Ambacht), fencer
 Flor Silvester (1923–2008), graphic designer 
 Henk van Lijnschooten (1928–2006 in H.I. Ambacht), composer
 Bart Berman (born 1938), pianist and composer
 Wim van Hanegem (born 1944), footballer
 Marco Janssen (born 1969 in H.I. Ambacht), econometrician
 Wim Jansen (1946–2022 in H.I. Ambacht), footballer
 Roeland Pruijssers (born 1989 in H.I. Ambacht), chess player

Gallery

References

External links

Official website

 
Municipalities of South Holland
Populated places in South Holland
Drechtsteden
IJsselmonde (island)